Iván Rodríguez (born 1971) is a Puerto Rican baseball player

Iván Rodríguez may also refer to:
Iván Rodríguez (sprinter) (born 1937), Puerto Rican sprinter
Iván Rodríguez Traverzo (born 1975), Puerto Rican politician
Iván Rodríguez Mesa (born 1977), Panamanian swimmer
Iván Rodríguez (footballer) (born 1996), Spanish footballer

See also
Eduardo Iván Rodríguez, Spanish hurdler